Hocine Harrouche (born December 9, 1987 in Algiers) is an Algerian football player. He currently plays for USM El Harrach in the Algerian Ligue Professionnelle 2.

Club career
Harrouche was loaned out by Paradou AC to NA Hussein Dey for the second half of the 2009–10 Algerian Championnat National. He made 12 appearances for the club, scoring  1 goal.

References

External links
 DZFoot Profile
 

1987 births
Living people
Footballers from Algiers
Algerian footballers
CR Belouizdad players
NA Hussein Dey players
Paradou AC players
Algerian Ligue Professionnelle 1 players
Association football midfielders
21st-century Algerian people